is a professional Japanese baseball player. He plays outfielder for the Tochigi Golden Braves of Baseball Challenge League.

Career

Tokyo Yakult Swallows
On December 2, 2017, he became a free agent.

Tochigi Golden Braves
On January 9, 2018, he signed with Tochigi Golden Braves of Baseball Challenge League.

References

External links

 NPB.com

1983 births
Living people
Japanese baseball coaches
Nippon Professional Baseball outfielders
Baseball people from Tochigi Prefecture
Tokyo Yakult Swallows players
West Oahu Canefires players
Japanese expatriate baseball players in the United States